The 1977–78 Ohio Bobcats men's basketball team represented Ohio University as a member of the Mid-American Conference in the college basketball season of 1977–78. The team was coached by Dale Bandy in his fourth season at Ohio. They played their home games at Convocation Center. The Bobcats finished with a record of 13–14 and seventh in the MAC regular season with a conference record of 6–10.

Schedule

|-
!colspan=9 style=| Regular Season

Source:

Statistics

Team Statistics
Final 1977–78 Statistics

Source

Player statistics

Source

References

Ohio Bobcats men's basketball seasons
Ohio
Ohio Bobcats men's basketball
Ohio Bobcats men's basketball